Thomas William Gould, VC (28 December 1914 – 6 December 2001) was a Royal Navy sailor and a recipient of the Victoria Cross, the highest award for gallantry in the face of the enemy that can be awarded to British and Commonwealth forces. He was one of three Jewish recipients of the Victoria Cross in the Second World War.

Second World War

Gould was 27 years old, and a petty officer in the Royal Navy during the Second World War, when the following deed took place for which he was awarded the Victoria Cross.

On 16 February 1942 north of Crete, in the Mediterranean, HM Submarine Thrasher, after attacking and sinking a supply ship, was itself attacked. Thrasher was subjected to a three-hour depth charge attack and aerial bombing.

When after dark the submarine surfaced, two unexploded bombs were discovered in the gun-casing. Petty Officer Gould and Lieutenant Peter Scawen Watkinson Roberts volunteered to remove the bombs, which were of a type unknown to them. They removed the first one without too much difficulty, but the second bomb had penetrated the side plating of the gun emplacement, and then the deck casing above the pressure hull.

The petty officer then lay on his back with the 150 lb bomb in his arms while the lieutenant dragged him along by the shoulders. "It was then a matter of the two of us, lying horizontally, pushing and pulling the bomb back through the casing. It was pitch black and the bomb was making this horrible ticking noise while the submarine was being buffeted by the waves".
They pushed and dragged the bomb for a distance of some  until it could be lowered over the side. Every time the bomb was moved there was a loud twanging noise as of a broken spring which added nothing to their peace of mind. Thrasher was surfaced, stationary, and close inshore to enemy waters. If the submarine was forced to crash dive while they were in the casing, they must have been drowned. It was 50 minutes before they got the bomb clear, wrapped it in sacking, and dropped it over the side.

In August 1943 Gould received a Mention in Despatches after the submarine Truculent sank U-308 off the Faroes on 4 June 1943.

Later life

Tommy Gould went on to become one of the founders of the 43 Group, a group of Jewish ex-servicemen who fought the Fascists after the Second World War.

His VC was sold at Sotheby's for £44,000 in October 1987. His medals are held by the Association of Jewish Ex-Servicemen and Women, in the Jewish Museum London in Camden.

References

External links
Lieutenant P.S.W. Roberts & Petty Officer Gould in The Art of War exhibition at the UK National Archives

1914 births
2001 deaths
British World War II recipients of the Victoria Cross
Royal Navy sailors
Royal Navy personnel of World War II
People from Dover, Kent
Royal Navy recipients of the Victoria Cross
Royal Navy submariners
English Jews
Jewish War Veterans
English anti-fascists
Jewish anti-fascists
Military personnel from Kent